Goldrich is a surname. Notable people with the surname include:

Jona Goldrich (1927–2016), American real estate developer and philanthropist
Sybil Niden Goldrich, American consumer rights advocate
Zina Goldrich (born 1964), American musical theatre composer

See also
Goodrich (disambiguation)